Ivaylo Ditchev is a Bulgarian anthropologist. He is the professor of cultural anthropology at Sofia University. He has also taught abroad, mainly in France and the United States.

Ditchev holds a doctorate from Sofia and Paris-7 universities. He focuses on political culture and urban anthropology of Southeast Europe and the Balkans.

Works 
"Cultural scenes of the political" Sofia, Prosveta, 2019 
"Culture as distance. 11 essays in cultural anthropology" Sofia university, 2016
'Citizens beyond places? New mobilities, new borders, new forms of belonging, Prosveta, 2009 (Bulgarian)
 Spaces of Desire, Desire of Spaces. Studies in Urban Anthropology, Sofia, 2005
 Form belonging to identity. Politics of the image, Sofia, 2002 
 Gift in the Age of its Technical Reproductibility, Sofia, 1999
 To Give Without Losing. Exchange in the imaginary of Modernity Paris, 1997
(French)
 Albania-Utopia. Behind Closed Doors in the Balkans, (author, editor) Paris, 1996 (French)
 Eroticism of authorship, Sofia, 1991
 Literalisms, miniatures, Sofia 1991
 Borders between me and me, essays, Sofia 1990
 A second after the end of the world, short stories, Sofia, 1988
 Identification, novel, Sofia, 1987
 Astral Calendar, short stories, Sofia 1982
 I learn to cry'', short stories, Sofia 1979

References

External links 
 Personal web page

Living people
1955 births
Bulgarian anthropologists
Bulgarian sociologists
Bulgarian journalists
Sofia University alumni
Academic staff of Sofia University